Ricardo Aparecido Tavares (born 23 April 1987 in São Manuel, São Paulo), commonly known as Rick, is a Brazilian football player at the position of midfielder. He currently plays for Guarany Sporting Club.

Career
He spent youth career at Palmeiras and played for Japanese club Tokyo Verdy at the age of 19. After finishing his contract with Verdy, he returned to Palmeiras but never played as a starting player.

Club statistics

References

External links
  
  
 Rick at BDFA.com.ar 
 

1987 births
Living people
Brazilian footballers
Association football midfielders
Sociedade Esportiva Palmeiras players
Marília Atlético Clube players
Mogi Mirim Esporte Clube players
Footballers from São Paulo (state)
J2 League players
Tokyo Verdy players
Brazilian expatriate footballers
Expatriate footballers in Japan
People from São Manuel